Templars, or Knights Templar, was a Medieval Catholic military order prominent in the Crusades.

Templar may also refer to:

Places
 Templar Channel, a channel in British Columbia, Canada, or the yacht for which it is named
 Templar House, a high-rise apartment building in Belfast, Northern Ireland
 Templars Square, a shopping complex in Cowley, Oxfordshire, England

People with the name
 Templar Saxe (1865–1935), British-born actor and opera singer
 Henry George Templar (1904–1988), American politician, attorney and federal judge
 Len Templar (born 1931), Australian rules footballer
 Richard Templar, the pen name of a British author who has written several self-development books
  Templar of Tyre, the name of a medieval historian and of the document he wrote in the 14th century, the third section of the Gestes des Chiprois

Arts, entertainment, and media

Fictional entities
 Templar (character class), a character class in Final Fantasy Tactics Advance
 Templar, a fictional country in the anime Kiba
 Simon Templar, a character in The Saint series of books and other media
High Templars, and Dark Templars, units of the Protoss race in the RTS game StarCraft
  Templars (Hyperion Cantos), religious characters in Dan Simmons's Hyperion Cantos
 Templars or Abstergo Industries, the main antagonists of Assassin's Creed
 Templars of the Templar Order, a military order in Dragon Age
 Templar, an assault OmniMech from the ‘’BattleTech’’ franchise

Music
 Templar (band), a Canadian alternative rock band
 The Templars (band), an American musical group formed in 1991

Other uses in arts, entertainment, and media
 Templar, Arizona, a webcomic
 Templar Poetry, an independent press in Derbyshire, England
 Templar Studios, video game design studio based in New York City, formed in 1997

Other uses
  Templar, a genus of harvestmen in the family Monoscutidae
 HMS Templar (P316), a Royal Navy submarine
 Templar automobile, U.S. manufacturer of automobiles in the 1920s

See also
 Knights Templar (disambiguation)
 Templer (disambiguation)